Attleboro High School is a public high school located in Attleboro, Massachusetts. The school is located at 1 Blue Pride Way. The school has an approximate student enrollment of 1,750 students in grades 9–12. The school's mascot is the Bombardiers known formally as (The Blue Bombardiers) and the school colors are Royal Blue, Silver, and White. The district recently completed construction on a new $259.9 million, 475,000-square-foot building to replace the former building previously located at 100 Rathbun Willard Drive. As of November 17th, 2022, the "Blue Bombardiers" has been redesigned.

Demographics
For the 2014–2015 school year the demographic profile of the enrollment is as follows:
Male - 52.8%
Female - 47.2% 
African American - 5.2%
Asian - 4.4%
Hispanic - 10.9%
Native American - 0.5%
White - 75.2%
Native Hawaiian, Pacific Islanders - 0.2%
Non Hispanic Multiracial - 3.7%

Athletics
Attleboro has a very long rivalry with neighboring towns North Attleborough High School. The football teams have played each other on Thanksgiving Day for the past 90 years. As of 2010, Attleboro competes in the Hockomock League. Before the move to the Hockomock, Attleboro competed in many other leagues such as the Old Colony League , Bristol County League, and for a long time the eastern athletic conference

 Fall Cheerleading National Champions - 2006, 2007, 2008, 2009, 2013, 2014
 Boys' Basketball D-I State Champions - 1943, 1998

Notable alumni
Meagan Fuller (class of 2010), Miss Massachusetts 2015
Paul Heroux (class of 1995), Former member of the Massachusetts House of Representatives, Current Mayor of Attleboro
Helen Guillette Vassallo (class of 1949), American scientific researcher, educator, author, lecturer, and business leader
Steve Hagerty (class of 1987), 21st Mayor of Evanston, IL, and Founder and CEO of Hagerty Consulting, Inc

References

Attleboro, Massachusetts
Educational institutions in the United States with year of establishment missing
Public high schools in Massachusetts
Schools in Bristol County, Massachusetts
Hockomock League